Sreevaraham Lakshmi Varaha Temple, locally known as Sreevaraham Temple, is situated at Sreevaraham, in Thiruvananthapuram, very near to the famous Sree Padmanabhaswamy Temple. The principal deity of this temple is Varahamurthy, the third incarnation of Lord Vishnu. This Hindu temple is administered by the Travancore Devaswom Board.

Deities and Sub-Deities
The main deity is Lord Vishnu in His incarnation as Varahamurthy in a sitting posture along with Lakshmi Devi. The sub-deities are Ganapathy, Sree Krishna, Nagarajah, Yakshiamma, etc.

Importance
The principal deity of this temple is Varahamurthy, the third incarnation of Lord Vishnu. There are only twenty three temples all over India dedicated to Lord Varaha and out of these only in a few are his consort Lakshmi Devi depicted alongside Lord Varaha. At Lakshmi Varaha Temple, Thiruvananthapuram Lakshmi Devi is shown as sitting on Lord Varaha's lap. Only three temples of Varahamurthy exist in Kerala. This temple in Thiruvananthapuram is believed to be more than 5000 years old.

Architecture
The temple is of typical Kerala style architecture and the sanctum is round in shape and its roof is covered with copper plates. The 'nalambalam' which is the outer structure is square shaped. There is a golden flag post in the temple.

Temple Pond
The temple pond needs special mention as it is the largest temple pond in Kerala and has an area of 8 acres. The large number of priests arriving for the Murajapam ritual at Sree Padmanabhaswamy temple takes bath in this pond. During Onam festival, a boat race is conducted in this pond.

Offerings
Offerings that are common in other Vishnu temples are done here also which includes 'Archana, Ganapathy Homam, Ashtothararchana, Thrimadhuram, Paalpayasam, Unniyappam, Thulabaram and so on.

Festivals
The main festival is in the Malayalam month of Meenam (mid March -mid April) and during the same period of 'Painguni Festival' of Sree Padmanabhaswamy temple. Varaha Jayanthi in the Malayalam month of Meenam is also celebrated in a grand manner.

See also
 Padmanabhaswamy Temple
 Sreekanteswaram Mahadeva Temple, Thiruvananthapuram
 Sasthamangalam Mahadevar Temple
 Anandavalleeswaram Temple,Kollam

References

Hindu temples in Thiruvananthapuram district
Varaha temples